Nolan North (born October 31, 1970)  is an American actor best known for his voice acting roles.

After his breakthrough role as Dr. Chris Ramsey on the ABC soap opera Port Charles in 1997, North moved into voice acting when the show ended in 2003 and has since become best known for his video game roles as Nathan Drake in the Uncharted series, Desmond Miles in the Assassin's Creed series, Merasmus in Team Fortress 2, the Prince in Prince of Persia (2008), Dr. Edward Richtofen in the Call of Duty Zombies mode, Deadpool in various Marvel Comics media, the Penguin in the Batman: Arkham franchise, Captain Martin Walker in Spec Ops: The Line, David in The Last of Us, himself as one of the voices for the player character in Saints Row IV, Tony Stark in Marvel's Avengers,  and Ghost in the Destiny video game series.

In animation, North voices Smokescreen on Transformers: Prime and Superboy on Young Justice.

Early life 
North was born in New Haven, Connecticut. He was raised in Warwick, Rhode Island, where he attended and played baseball at Bishop Hendricken High School. He majored in journalism with a baseball scholarship at the University of North Carolina at Chapel Hill, and spent the next year working as a reporter in New Jersey before moving to New York City to pursue a career in stand-up comedy and acting.

Career 
North eventually relocated to Los Angeles, where he was cast as Dr. Chris Ramsey in the General Hospital spin-off series Port Charles in 1997. He worked as a voice actor on a few video games during this time, and began to focus on this career path following the cancellation of Port Charles in 2003.

One of North's most notable voice roles came in 2007, when he voiced and performed motion capture for the protagonist Nathan Drake in the video game Uncharted: Drake's Fortune. Since then, he has continued to portray the character in Uncharted 2: Among Thieves (2009), Uncharted 3: Drake's Deception (2011), and  Uncharted 4: A Thief's End (2016), as well as the PlayStation Vita exclusive Uncharted: Golden Abyss (2012). In an interview with The Guardian, he said his time as Drake requires "a lot of imagination" because "motion capture is basically theatre in spandex; there's minimal props, and you need a willingness to make an ass of yourself". For his role as Drake, he has twice been nominated at the Spike Video Game Awards in the "Best Performance by a Human Male" category.

North's other notable video game voice roles include the Prince in Prince of Persia, Vossler in Final Fantasy XII, Eradan in Lord of the Rings: War in the North, the male Jedi Consular in Star Wars: The Old Republic and its following expansions,  David in The Last of Us, Dr. Edward Richtofen in the "Zombies" mode of the Call of Duty series, Brawl in Transformers: War for Cybertron, and Ghost Rider in Marvel: Ultimate Alliance, as well as Shadow Demon, Lycan, Lone Druid, Brewmaster, Gyrocopter, Ogre Magi, Meepo, Earth Spirit, Troll Warlord, and the Keeper of the Light in Dota 2. He voices various Team Fortress 2 characters such as the Engineer (partially), Merasmus, Redmond Mann, Blutarch Mann, Zepheniah Mann, and the Bombinomicon. He also replaced Peter Dinklage as the voice of the Ghost in Destiny: The Taken King, and additionally re-recorded all of Dinklage's lines from the base game Destiny. He continues to voice the character in subsequent releases. Following the release of Destiny 2: Forsaken, he portrayed not only Ghost but also took over the role of Cayde-6 from Nathan Fillion.

In the 2013 film Star Trek Into Darkness, North made one of his few increasingly rare live-action appearances since becoming a voice actor. Director J. J. Abrams had cited North's performance as Drake in the decision to cast him as a starship helmsman, as he and his son are fans of the Uncharted series. In a May 2012 interview, North said, "[Abrams is] a huge fan of gaming and he was telling me how people just don't understand [the medium] yet, but they're going to catch up. They don't understand how amazing this technology is and it doesn't get the respect it deserves, but if it keeps making the money it makes you're going to see more and more people converted. I mean, Gary Oldman, one of the greatest actors on the planet, did Call of Duty. He wouldn't have done it 10 years ago. It's a new age dawning, and I'm just really proud to be part of it."

North's animation roles include the voices of Cyclops in Wolverine and the X-Men, Snow Job in G.I. Joe: Renegades, Raphael in TMNT, both Superboy and Superman in Young Justice, and Smokescreen in Transformers: Prime. He has also voiced Blaze in Blaze and the Monster Machines since 2014. He was honored at a special event hosted by the British Academy of Film and Television Arts during the 2018 EA Expo, where he was given a special award for "outstanding contribution to performance in games".

In April 2018, North began hosting Retro Replay with fellow voice actor and frequent co-star Troy Baker. The show, which featured the two playing games in which they were involved while giving behind-the-scenes commentary on the making of the games, partnered with Rooster Teeth in April 2019. Baker left Retro Replay in April 2020, due to an apparent disagreement on the future direction of the show. The following month, North announced that the show was ending its partnership with Rooster Teeth. He had a brief cameo in the 2022 Uncharted film adaptation and also narrated the audiobook edition.

Personal life 
North married his Port Charles co-star Jill Murray on June 4, 1999. They have two children together.

Filmography

Voice acting

Film

Animation

Video games

Live-action

Film

Television

Audiobooks

Accolades 
Nolan North has received multiple awards and nominations for his work in the Uncharted series (2007–2016), as well as other video games including Deadpool (2013), The Last of Us (2013), Assassin's Creed II (2009) and the television shows Young Justice (2010–present) and Transformers: Prime (2010–2013).
The Game Awards
{|class="wikitable plainrowheaders"
|-
! scope="col" style="width:1em;"|  Year
! scope="col" style="width:25em;"| Nominated work
! scope="col" style="width:40em;"| Category
! scope="col" style="width:5em;"| Result
|-
! scope="row"| 2016
| Uncharted 4: A Thief's End
| Best Performance
| 

British Academy Games Awards
{|class="wikitable plainrowheaders"
|-
! scope="col" style="width:1em;"|  Year
! scope="col" style="width:25em;"| Nominated work
! scope="col" style="width:40em;"| Category
! scope="col" style="width:5em;"| Result
|-
! scope="row" | 2012
| Uncharted 3: Drake's Deception
| rowspan="3"|Best Performer
| 
|-
! scope="row" | 2013
| Uncharted: Golden Abyss
| 
|-
! scope="row" | 2017
| Uncharted 4: A Thief's End
| 
|-
! scope="row" | 2018
| Nolan North
| Special Award
| 

D.I.C.E. Awards
{|class="wikitable plainrowheaders"
|-
! scope="col" style="width:1em;"|  Year
! scope="col" style="width:25em;"| Nominated work
! scope="col" style="width:40em;"| Category
! scope="col" style="width:5em;"| Result
|-
! scope="row" | 2010
| Uncharted 2: Among Thieves
| Outstanding Achievement in Character Performance
| 
|-
! scope="row" | 2016
| Uncharted 4: A Thief's End
| Outstanding Achievement in Character
| 

Spike Video Game Awards
{|class="wikitable plainrowheaders"
|-
! scope="col" style="width:1em;"|  Year
! scope="col" style="width:25em;"| Nominated work
! scope="col" style="width:40em;"| Category
! scope="col" style="width:5em;"| Result
|-
! scope="row" | 2009
| Uncharted 2: Among Thieves
| Best Voice
| 
|-
! scope="row" | 2011
| Uncharted 3: Drake's Deception
| Best Performance by a Human Male
| 

Behind the Voice Actors Awards

References

External links 

 
 
 

Living people
American male film actors
American male television actors
American male video game actors
American male voice actors
Bishop Hendricken High School alumni
Comedy YouTubers
Gaming YouTubers
Male actors from New Haven, Connecticut
North Carolina Tar Heels baseball players
UNC Hussman School of Journalism and Media alumni
YouTube channels launched in 2018
20th-century American male actors
21st-century American male actors
1970 births
The Game Awards winners